Done with Mirrors is the eighth studio album by American rock band Aerosmith, released on November 4, 1985. It marked the return to the band of guitarists Joe Perry, who left in 1979 and Brad Whitford, who departed in 1981. The band's first album on Geffen Records, it was intended as their ‘comeback’. However, the record didn’t live up to commercial expectations despite positive reviews.

Background
"Let the Music Do the Talking" was a rerecording of the title track from first album by the Joe Perry Project, with altered lyrics and melody.

Brad Whitford revealed that producer Ted Templeman wanted to capture the band's aggressive, "out of control freight train" sound by removing the red light indicating that recording was underway (a technique he had used to capture Van Halen's sound). Templeman told the band to run through the songs in the studio and recorded them without their knowledge. Whitford referred to the nerves generated when knowingly recording songs as "the red light blues".

"I had a great time making that record," Templeman told The Washington Posts Geoff Edgers, "and Steven was one of the most amazing guys. But we had to do that record in Berkeley because they didn’t want those guys to score (drugs). They didn’t want them to be in L.A. or San Francisco. I wasn’t familiar with the board. As a producer, if you know your room and the mic preamps, you know how things are going to sound. I don’t think I made Joey’s drums sound as good as they could have or Joe’s guitar."

Viacom (MTV & VH1) executive Doug Herzog recalled that, after this album, "Aerosmith was done… They were a little bit of a joke." However, they would revive their career in 1986 with a landmark remake of 1975's "Walk This Way" with hip-hop group Run DMC, followed by an album that would eventually go 5× Platinum – Permanent Vacation – in 1987.

Done with Mirrors is the last Aerosmith record written without the aid of outside songwriters, as of Music from Another Dimension!

Packaging and title
In keeping with the title, all the text (bar the catalog number and UPC) on the original releases were written back-to-front – to be read by holding it to a mirror. Rereleases flip the artwork so it can be read without a mirror, and add the band's logo. As a result, the original CD (which came in a longbox) is collectable (all text in the booklet of the first CD pressing is also back-to-front).

The title refers both to illusions that are "done with mirrors", and the laying out of drugs such as cocaine, traditionally snorted off a mirror.

 Reception 
On VH1 Classic's That Metal Show, Joey Kramer expressed his dislike of Done with Mirrors, claiming the band "never really finished it".

Joe Perry was similarly dismissive: "Done with Mirrors, as far as I'm concerned, is our least inspired record. But I've heard fans really like it so I'm not gonna stand there and tell 'em, 'No, it sucks.' We had to do that record to get to the next one so it served its purpose. I just don't think it's up to the standard of some of our others."

Despite the band's views, this album earned mostly positive reviews.

Track listing

PersonnelAerosmithSteven Tylerlead vocals, piano, harmonica, percussion 
Joe Perryguitar, slide guitar, backing vocals
Brad Whitfordguitar, acoustic guitar
Tom Hamiltonbass guitar
Joey Kramerdrums, percussionProduction'
Ted Templeman – producer
Jeff Hendrickson – engineer, mixing
Tom Size, Gary Rindfuss, Stan Katayama – assistant engineers
Howie Weinberg – analog mastering engineer at Masterdisk, New York
Ken Caillat – digital mastering
Joan Parker – production coordinator
Kent Ayeroff – album cover concept
Norman Moore – art direction and design
Jim Shea  – photography
John Kalodner – A&R

Charts

Certification

See also 
Done with Mirrors Tour

References

Bibliography

Further reading

1985 albums
Aerosmith albums
Albums produced by Ted Templeman
Geffen Records albums